WUSX (98.5 FM) is an American radio station licensed to Seaford, Delaware and serving Salisbury, Maryland, Ocean City, Maryland, Southern Delaware, Virginia, and the rest of Delmarva, with studios and cluster offices located in Salisbury. Its tower is located in Seaford.

Mornings previously featured The Bob and Tom Show, middays and afternoons with local on air personalities, and nights with Rock & Roll Hall of Famer Alice Cooper. Music consisted classic rock from the 1970s, '80s, and '90s.

History
98.3 WSUX-FM signed on the air in February 1972, carrying the programming of 1280 WSUX.

Previous studios were located along U.S. Route 13 in Seaford, Delaware. The station originally transmitted at 98.3 FM before moving to 98.5 FM in 1998. Previous formats included an easy listening format with call letters WSUX-FM (Sussex County) and WECY-FM (Easy).

On August 17, 2018, the station's WGBG-FM call letters and format moved from 98.5 FM to WKHI 107.7 FM Fruitland, MD, and 98.5 continued to simulcast 107.7 under new WKHI calls, until a new format is announced. The station changed its call sign again on August 24, 2018, to WUSX.

On September 17, 2018, WUSX split from its simulcast with WGBG-FM and began stunting towards a new format to launch on September 21, 2018, at 5 pm.

On September 21, 2018 at 5 p.m., WUSX flipped to a Gold-Based Country music format, branded as "US 98.5".

On December 1, 2021, WUSX was purchased by Datatech Digital LLC and changed format from country to a simulcast of talk-formatted WGMD 92.7 FM Rehoboth Beach.

Former personalities
Dave Fleetwood (1970s, now afternoons at WVLT/Vineland, New Jersey)
Allan Frazier (1972-1980)
Bob Mathers 
Dave Jackson (David Pinson)

Transmitter
The transmitter is a class A transmitter, 6,000 watts, HAAT 98 meters, located in Seaford, Delaware.  Facility ID 4340. Located on coordinates

Previous logo

References

External links
Adams Radio Group Website

USX
News and talk radio stations in the United States